Guffey is a census-designated place (CDP) and post office in and governed by Park County, Colorado, United States. The Guffey post office has the ZIP Code 80820. At the United States Census 2010, the population of the Guffey CDP was 98, while the population of the 80820 ZIP Code Tabulation Area was 806 including adjacent areas. The CDP is a part of the Denver–Aurora–Lakewood, CO Metropolitan Statistical Area.

History
The town was once called Freshwater, and was the center of activity for the Freshwater Mining District, a minor producer of copper, lead, zinc, mica, feldspar, and other minerals, including traces of gold and silver.
Activity and population peaked between the years 1895 and 1902, with over 500 residents and 40 businesses in the town. Cattle ranching and lumber operations supplemented the mining activity. The town was also known for its dances and fiddlers.

In January 2001, the bodies of three members of the Dutcher family were found near Guffey; all had been murdered. Three teenagers were convicted of the crime. The boys had formed a group that took on aspects of a paramilitary organization, and one of them claimed that the murders were part of a plan to fight insurrection in the country of Guyana. The brutal nature of the crime and its bizarre motive attracted national attention.

The town has a cat named "Monster" as its unofficial Mayor.
 The town is perhaps less famous for its annual Fourth of July Chicken Fly, a tradition which lasted for twenty-six years, but ending in 2016.  At the chicken-fly, small chickens were released from a velvet-lined mailbox atop a ten-foot-high (3.04 m) platform; prizes were awarded for those chickens that flew the greatest distance.

Geography
Guffey is located about one mile north of State Highway 9 on County Road 102, southeast of South Park. Freshwater Creek flows past the east side of the community.

Geology
Rocks from two distinct times in Earth's history, the Precambrian and the Paleogene, are exposed in the area. The Precambrian rocks, comprising both igneous intrusive and metamorphic rocks over one billion years old, host mineral deposits of minor economic significance. The relatively much younger Paleogene rocks were erupted by the Guffey volcanic center of the Thirtynine Mile volcanic area about 34 million years ago and are associated with the fossil deposits at Florissant Fossil Beds National Monument.

Meteorite

In 1907, a 309 kilogram (681.2-lb.) meteorite was found near Guffey by two cowboys, although the exact location was not recorded. To date, this is the largest meteorite ever recovered in the state of Colorado. It is classified as an ungrouped iron meteorite, sometimes considered an ataxite due to its high nickel content and lack of Widmanstätten patterns. Most of the meteorite resides in New York City at the American Museum of Natural History, although the Denver Museum of Nature and Science has acquired a slice. No samples are available for public viewing in Guffey itself.

Demographics

See also

 Census-designated places in Colorado

References

External links

 Guffey, Colorado
 Guffey Community Association
 Guffey @ Colorado.com
 Guffey @ UncoverColorado.com
 Guffey @ WesternMiningHistory.com
 Guffey, Colorado Mining Claims And Mines
 Southern Park County Fire Protection District
 Park County website

Census-designated places in Park County, Colorado
Census-designated places in Colorado